Shezan International Limited is a Pakistani beverage manufacturer based in Lahore. It is one of the biggest food and beverage manufacturers in Pakistan. Two of their most famous brands are All Pure and Twist. This company is a part of Shahnawaz Group and is traded on the Pakistan Stock Exchange.

Since its inception in 1964, Shezan has produced various products including soft drinks, juices, ketchups, and jams. The company is also the single largest grower of mangoes in Pakistan, and employs roughly 1,000 persons. The company is best known for its trademark product, 'Shezan Mango', a mango juice drink popular in Pakistan.

History
Shezan International was incorporated on May 13, 1964; conceived as a joint venture by the Shahnawaz Group, Pakistan and Alliance Industrial Development Corporation, United States in 1964.

Shezan remains amongst Pakistan's largest food processing units, having developed and installed the capacity to meet the country's domestic as well as export needs.

In 1971, Shahnawaz Group purchased all the shares of Alliance Industrial Development Corporation with the permission of the Government of Pakistan. In 1980–81, a separate unit was installed in Karachi, which now caters for Karachi, Sindh and also meets the export demand. A bottle filling plant was set up in 1983 in Lahore, Punjab. An independent Tetra Brik plant was commissioned in 1987. In 1990, it was decided to install a juice factory at Hattar, Khyber Pakhtunkhwa, Pakistan.

Shezan International's head office is located in Lahore, Pakistan. In England, Nuovo Foods Limited is the authorized distributor for all Shezan products. They conduct all the import and distribution of juices, jams, pickles, chutneys, sauces, syrups and squashes.
 
In Canada, Target Foods is authorized distributor. In Bangladesh, Sajeeb foods is authorized distributor for all Shezan products.

Controversy
Shezan has been the frequent target of controversy due to the Ahmadi affiliation of its owners. Several campaigns led by religious conservatives have in the past targeted Shezan, calling for its boycott, and subsequent ban.

Shezan products ban 
In 2012, campaigns by traditionally bright Islamic groups found a more liberal voice, amongst these were lawyers from Lahore Bar Association. Soon thereafter, The Lahore Bar Association also banned Shezan products from its premises and subordinate court complexes, threatening tough actions against anyone found buying the drink. The move came as 100 lawyers unanimously voted for the ban on Shezan drinks and products.

Attacks 
As a consequence of the numerous initiatives to boycott Shezan products in systematic Anti-Ahmadiyya campaigns, several attacks have been recorded against Shezan factories. In June 2010, unidentified assailants stormed a Shezan factory after which high-explosive bombs were detonated that left four injured.

References

External links 
 Shezan International Limited

Pakistani drinks
Pakistani brands
Food and drink companies established in 1964
1964 establishments in Pakistan
Desi cuisine
Drink companies of Pakistan
Manufacturing companies based in Lahore
Ahmadiyya in Pakistan
Companies listed on the Pakistan Stock Exchange